Myths and Hymns (originally known as Saturn Returns) is a song cycle by composer Adam Guettel, based on Greek myth and lyrics found in an antique hymnal.

Myths and Hymns was first performed Off-Broadway, under the title Saturn Returns, at the Public Theater on March 31, 1998 and closed on April 26, 1998 after 16 performances. It was directed by Tina Landau with a cast of 6 performers that included Annie Golden, Vivian Cherry, Theresa McCarthy, Lawrence Clayton, Jose Llana and Bob Stillman.  Myths and Hymns is structured as a revue, with no through plot. Performed in concert format, it concerns the relationship of humans to gods, past and present. The songs range from electronic jazz and piano ballad to gospel and musical theater.

Myths and Hymns received its first narrative treatment, written and directed by Elizabeth Lucas (Clear Blue Tuesday), in February 2012 at Prospect Theater in New York City . This marks the first production of the show in New York since its premiere at the Public and the first ever in New York under the current title.

Song list 
A cast recording was released by Nonesuch on March 30, 1999. The performers on the recording include the off-Broadway cast, and also include others who were not in that production. Performers include: Adam Guettel, Audra McDonald, Mandy Patinkin, Kristin Chenoweth, Vivian Cherry, Billy Porter and Theresa McCarthy.

Songs on the recording in its final form:
Children of the Heavenly King
At the Sounding
Saturn Returns
Icarus
Migratory V
Link
Hero and Leander
Sisyphus 
Come to Jesus
How Can I Lose You?
Awaiting You
The Great Highway 
There's a Land
Saturn Returns (Reprise)

European premiere
The show had its European premiere at the Finborough Theatre, London, on 22 April 2007, and was scheduled to run a further two performances on 29 April and 6 May. Due to popular demand the show was scheduled for two further performances on 30 April and 7 May. Directed by Tom Cooper, and with musical direction from Joe Hood, the cast featured Leon Craig, Ashleigh Gray, Hazel Holder, Craig Purnell, David Randall, and Caroline Sheen.

"... This is musical theatre that is challenging, compelling and compulsive... there is an astonishing intelligence and physicality throughout... bring yourself to it - as the fiercely committed cast of Tom Cooper’s production do - and it one of the most rewarding experiences you can have..."  Mark Shenton, "The Stage"

Song list
The show's order followed that of the score rather than the recording: 
Prometheus
Saturn Returns
Icarus
Migratory V
Pegasus
Jesus the Mighty Conqueror
Children of the Heavenly King
At the Sounding
Build a Bridge
Sisyphus
Life is but a Dream
Link
Hero & Leander
Come to Jesus
How Can I Lose You?
Awaiting You
The Great Highway
There's a Land
Saturn Returns (Reprise)

References

External links
 "Review:Myths Made Potent Through Stylistic Somersaults,The New York Times, April 10, 1998 
 Time Magazine, May 17, 1999

Song cycles
Musicals based on religious traditions
1998 musicals